Weaverthorpe railway station was a minor railway station serving the village of Sherburn  in North Yorkshire, England. Located on the York to Scarborough Line it was opened on 5 July 1845 by the York and North Midland Railway. It closed to passengers on 22 September 1930.

History
The station was originally named Sherburn, but was renamed Wykeham (after a village  distant) on 1 April 1874, to avoid confusion with three other stations also named Sherburn. The name changed again after the opening of a station in Wykeham itself (on the Forge Valley Line), and the station became 'Weaverthorpe' on 1 May 1882.

Services at the station consisted of four per day (each way) in 1847, and 1866 rising to six per day by 1877. Bradshaws timetable for 1906, still lists six stopping services each way, every two to three hours.

This was due to the low receipts generated by each station, but additionally, the closures allowed the LNER to speed up the services on the line.

Weaverthorpe station was to the immediate east of the level crossing, with the goods crane on the west side. The station did retain a small goods yard until 1981, which handled steel traffic for a local construction company.

Passengers wishing to go to Weaverthorpe would have been very disappointed as that village was located  distant, over the Wolds escarpment! Both the station house (now in private ownership) and the signal box, were grade II listed in December 1987. The signal box is the only one still in operation for the  stretch between Malton and Seamer, and is due to be closed in 2025, when signalling on the line will be transferred to York Rail Operating Centre.

References

Sources

External links

 Weaverthorpe station on navigable 1947 O. S. map

Disused railway stations in North Yorkshire
Railway stations in Great Britain opened in 1845
Railway stations in Great Britain closed in 1930
Former York and North Midland Railway stations
George Townsend Andrews railway stations